This is the discography page of American R&B/soul singer Chrisette Michele. She has released five albums in her career.

Albums

Studio albums

Extended plays

Mixtapes

Singles

As main artist

As featured artist

Guest appearances

References 

Discographies of American artists
Rhythm and blues discographies
Soul music discographies